International Studies  publishes original research articles on a wide range of issues and problems, as well as on the theoretical debates of contemporary relevance in the broader field of International Relations and Area Studies.
Published in association with Jawaharlal Nehru University, New Delhi. This journal is a member of the Committee on Publication Ethics (COPE). The journal was established in 1959.

References 

 Jawaharlal Nehru University, New Delhi

External links 
 
 Homepage

SAGE Publishing academic journals
Publications established in 1959
International relations journals
Triannual journals